Sandra Prodanović (born 1 April 1988), better known as Sandra Afrika, is a Serbian pop-folk singer. Born in Belgrade, she initially served as the backup dancer to singer Mile Kitić, before pursuing a music career with the song "Afrika" (2007), from which she also got her stage name. In 2011, she released her self-titled debut CD through DM SAT, featuring previously released songs. Afrika gained more significant popularity following the release of "Neko će mi noćas" (2012).

Over the years she has had several collaborations with Romanian recording artist Costi Ioniţă, including "Devojka tvog druga" (2013) and "Bye Bye" (2014). 

According to media reports, Prodanović began an off again-on again relationship with footballer Vladimir Volkov in 2017.

Discography
Albums, EPs & compilations
 Afrika (2011)
 Pijana (2017)
 The Best Of (2019)

Singles
 "Pozovi ga ti" (2015); feat. Goca Tržan
 "Usne bez karmina" (2015)
 "Ljubav stara" (2015)
 "Mojito" (2016)
 "Buduće bivše" (2017)
 "Dijabole" (2017)
 "Deža vu" (2018); feat. Costi Ioniţă and Đani
 "Znam da preteram" (2018)
 "Impozantno" (2018)
 "SOS" (2019); feat. Balkaton Gang and Rasta
 "JBM" (2019)
 "Flert" (2020)
 "Devojka sa Balkana" (2020)
 "Drama" (2020)
 "Loše loše" (2020)
 "Hej srce" (2021)
 "Emotivni manijak" (2021)
 "Pun mesec" (2021)
 "Turbolencija" (2022); feat. Costi

See also
 Music of Serbia
 Turbo-folk

References

External links
 
 

1988 births
Living people
21st-century Serbian women singers
Serbian turbo-folk singers
Serbian folk-pop singers
Serbian people of Croatian descent